Leon Melvyn Simon , born in 1945, is a Leroy P. Steele Prize and Bôcher Prize-winning mathematician, known for deep contributions to the fields of geometric analysis, geometric measure theory, and partial differential equations. He is currently Professor Emeritus in the Mathematics Department at Stanford University.

Biography

Academic career
Leon Simon, born 6 July 1945, received his BSc from the University of Adelaide in 1967, and his PhD in 1971 from the same institution, under the direction of James H. Michael. His doctoral thesis was titled Interior Gradient Bounds for Non-Uniformly Elliptic Equations. He was employed from 1968 to 1971 as a Tutor in Mathematics by the university.

Simon has since held a variety of academic positions. He worked first at Flinders University as a lecturer, then at Australian National University as a professor, at the University of Melbourne, the University of Minnesota, at ETH Zurich, and at Stanford. He first came to Stanford in 1973 as Visiting Assistant Professor and was awarded a full professorship in 1986.

Simon has more than 100 'mathematical descendants', according to the Mathematics Genealogy Project. Among his doctoral students there is Richard Schoen, a former winner of the Bôcher Memorial Prize.

Honours
In 1983 Simon was awarded the Australian Mathematical Society Medal. In the same year he was elected as a Fellow of the Australian Academy of Science. He was an invited speaker at the 1983 International Congress of Mathematicians in Warsaw.
In 1994, he was awarded the Bôcher Memorial Prize. The Bôcher Prize is awarded every five years to a groundbreaking author in analysis. In the same year he was also elected a fellow of the American Academy of Arts and Sciences. In May 2003 he was elected a fellow of the Royal Society. In 2012 he became a fellow of the American Mathematical Society. In 2017 he was awarded the Leroy P. Steele Prize for Seminal Contribution to Research.

Research activity
Simon's best known work, for which he was honored with the Leroy P. Steele Prize for Seminal Contribution to Research, deals with the uniqueness of asymptotics of certain nonlinear evolution equations and Euler-Lagrange equations. The main tool is an infinite-dimensional extension and corollary of the Łojasiewicz inequality, using the standard Fredholm theory of elliptic operators and Lyapunov-Schmidt reduction. The resulting Łojasiewicz−Simon inequalities are of interest in and of themselves and have found many applications in geometric analysis.

Simon's primary applications of his Łojasiewicz−Simon inequalities deal with the uniqueness of tangent cones of minimal surfaces and of tangent maps of harmonic maps, making use of the deep regularity theories of William Allard, Richard Schoen, and Karen Uhlenbeck. Other authors have made fundamental use of Simon's results, such as Rugang Ye's use for the uniqueness of subsequential limits of Yamabe flow. A simplification and extension of some aspects of Simon's work was later found by Mohamed Ali Jendoubi and others.

Simon also made a general study of the Willmore functional for surfaces in general codimension, relating the value of the functional to several geometric quantities. Such geometric estimates have proven to be relevant in a number of other important works, such as in Ernst Kuwert and Reiner Schätzle's analysis of Willmore flow and in Hubert Bray's proof of the Riemannian Penrose inequality. Simon himself was able to apply his analysis to establish the existence of minimizers of the Willmore functional with prescribed topological type.

With his thesis advisor James Michael, Simon provided a fundamental Sobolev inequality for submanifolds of Euclidean space, the form of which depends only on dimension and on the length of the mean curvature vector. An extension to submanifolds of Riemannian manifolds is due to David Hoffman and Joel Spruck. Due to the geometric dependence of the Michael−Simon and Hoffman−Spruck inequalities, they have been crucial in a number of contexts, including in Schoen and Shing-Tung Yau's resolution of the positive mass theorem and Gerhard Huisken's analysis of mean curvature flow.

Robert Bartnik and Simon considered the problem of prescribing the boundary and mean curvature of a spacelike hypersurface of Minkowski space. They set up the problem as a second-order partial differential equation for a scalar graphing function, giving novel perspective and results for some of the underlying issues previously considered in Shiu-Yuen Cheng and Yau's analysis of similar problems.

Using approximation by harmonic polynomials, Robert Hardt and Simon studied the zero set of solutions of general second-order elliptic partial differential equations, obtaining information on Hausdorff measure and rectifiability. By combining their results with earlier results of Harold Donnelly and Charles Fefferman, they obtained asymptotic information on the sizes of the zero sets of the eigenfunctions of the Laplace-Beltrami operator on a Riemannian manifold.

Schoen, Simon, and Yau studied stable minimal hypersurfaces of Riemannian manifolds, identifying a simple combination of Simons' formula with the stability inequality which produced various curvature estimates. As a consequence, they were able to re-derive some results of Simons such as the Bernstein theorem in appropriate dimensions. The Schoen−Simon−Yau estimates were adapted from the setting of minimal surfaces to that of "self-shrinking" surfaces by Tobias Colding and William Minicozzi, as part of their analysis of singularities of mean curvature flow. The stable minimal hypersurface theory itself was taken further by Schoen and Simon six years later, using novel methods to provide geometric estimates without dimensional restriction. As opposed to the earlier purely analytic estimates, Schoen and Simon used the machinery of geometric measure theory. The Schoen−Simon estimates are fundamental for the general Almgren–Pitts min-max theory, and consequently for its various applications.

William Meeks, Simon, and Yau obtained a number of remarkable results on minimal surfaces and the topology of three-dimensional manifolds, building in large part on earlier works of Meeks and Yau. Some similar results were obtained around the same time by Michael Freedman, Joel Hass, and Peter Scott.

Bibliography

Textbooks.

 
 
Articles.

References

Further reading
. 

.

External links

1945 births
Living people
20th-century Australian mathematicians
21st-century Australian mathematicians
Fellows of the Royal Society
Stanford University Department of Mathematics faculty
Fellows of the Australian Academy of Science
Fellows of the American Mathematical Society
Mathematical analysts